Michala Kvapilová (born ) is a Czech female volleyball player. She is part of the Czech Republic women's national volleyball team. 

She participated in the 2014 FIVB Volleyball World Grand Prix, and in the 2015 FIVB Volleyball World Grand Prix
On club level she played for PVK Olymp Praha in 2014.

References

External links
 Profile at FIVB.org
 http://www.sc-potsdam.de/volleyball-bundesliga/michala-kvapilova-verstaerkt-den-sc-potsdam/
 

1990 births
Living people
Czech women's volleyball players
Sportspeople from Ostrava
Women's beach volleyball players